Variational message passing (VMP) is an approximate inference technique for continuous- or discrete-valued Bayesian networks, with conjugate-exponential parents, developed by John Winn. VMP was developed as a means of generalizing the approximate variational methods used by such techniques as latent Dirichlet allocation, and works by updating an approximate distribution at each node through messages in the node's Markov blanket.

Likelihood lower bound

Given some set of hidden variables  and observed variables , the goal of approximate inference is to lower-bound the probability that a graphical model is in the configuration . Over some probability distribution  (to be defined later),

.

So, if we define our lower bound to be

,

Because the relative entropy is non-negative, the function  defined above is indeed a lower bound of the log likelihood of our observation . In particular, VMP uses a factorized distribution

where  is a disjoint part of the graphical model.

Determining the update rule
The likelihood estimate needs to be as large as possible; because it's a lower bound, getting closer  improves the approximation of the log likelihood.

,

where  is the expectation over all distributions  except . Thus, if we set  to be , the bound  is maximized.

Messages in variational message passing
Parents send their children the expectation of their sufficient statistic while children send their parents their natural parameter, which also requires messages to be sent from the co-parents of the node.

Relationship to exponential families
Because all nodes in VMP come from exponential families and all parents of nodes are conjugate to their children nodes, the expectation of the sufficient statistic can be computed from the normalization factor.

VMP algorithm
The algorithm begins by computing the expected value of the sufficient statistics for that vector. Then, until the likelihood converges to a stable value (this is usually accomplished by setting a small threshold value and running the algorithm until it increases by less than that threshold value), do the following at each node:
Get all messages from parents.
Get all messages from children (this might require the children to get messages from the co-parents).
Compute the expected value of the nodes sufficient statistics.

Constraints
Because every child must be conjugate to its parent, this has limited the types of distributions that can be used in the model. Discrete variables can have Dirichlet parents, and Poisson and exponential nodes must have gamma parents. More recently, VMP has been extended to handle models that violate this conditional conjugacy constraint.

References

External links
Infer.NET: an inference framework which includes an implementation of VMP with examples.
dimple: an open-source inference system supporting VMP.
An older implementation of VMP with usage examples.

Bayesian networks